The Fulk Building is a historic commercial building at 300 Main Street in Little Rock, Arkansas.  It is a three-story brick Romanesque Revival building, with commercial storefronts on the ground floor, and two-story round-arch bays on the upper levels.  Built about 1900 for attorney and landowner Francis Fulk, it typifies buildings that lined Main Street around the turn of the 20th century, and is one of its better examples of Romanesque architecture.

The building was listed on the National Register of Historic Places in 1986.

See also
National Register of Historic Places listings in Little Rock, Arkansas

References

Commercial buildings on the National Register of Historic Places in Arkansas
Gothic Revival architecture in Arkansas
Buildings and structures in Little Rock, Arkansas
National Register of Historic Places in Little Rock, Arkansas
Historic district contributing properties in Arkansas
Commercial buildings completed in 1900